Kahrizak (also Romanized as Kahrīzak) is a village in Ramjin Rural District, Chaharbagh District, Savojbolagh County, Alborz Province, Iran. At the 2006 census, its population was 659, in 160 families.

References 

Populated places in Savojbolagh County